Furling refers to stowing or dousing a boat's sail by flaking (folding), packing (like stuffing a spinnaker into a bag), or stowing it in part or whole using roller furling. 

Furling is not synonymous with dousing (dropping) or reefing (reducing the exposed area of) a sail, but modern technologies such as roller furling are altering the term's traditional use.

Sailing rigs and rigging